Dalibor Doder (born 24 May 1979 in Malmö) is a Swedish professional handballer, who currently plays for Vinslövs HK. He competed for the Swedish national team at the 2012 Summer Olympics in London. His parents emigrated from SR Serbia to Sweden, where they met.

References

1979 births
Swedish male handball players
Handball players at the 2012 Summer Olympics
Olympic handball players of Sweden
Olympic medalists in handball
Medalists at the 2012 Summer Olympics
Olympic silver medalists for Sweden
Swedish people of Serbian descent
Sportspeople from Malmö
Living people
Serb diaspora sportspeople